Eric Strand (born September 28, 1980 in San Francisco, California), better known as Fatgums, is an American record producer, hip hop DJ and independent record label owner/president. He is best known for his work with rapper Bambu of the rap group Native Guns. Fatgums' independent record label, Beatrock Music, was founded in 2009 in collaboration with the Long Beach based clothing company Beatrock.

Background
Fatgums started his music career in 1993 as a DJ/turntablist in the San Francisco Bay Area. In 1999, he moved to Los Angeles to attend college at UCLA. He began his professional hip hop production career after graduating in 2004.

Recent and current projects
In April 2009, Fatgums and Bambu released the critically acclaimed EP, Beatrock Presents: Fatgums x Bambu ...A Peaceful Riot.... The musical chemistry between Fatgums and Bambu has been likened to that of 9th Wonder and Murs. Bookends (produced by Fatgums and Gammaray) by Novelists (Ajax and Randall Park aka Randruff), was his first full-length production effort.

Discography

Mixtapes
 2000: OHHSSH!! by Fatgums and Gammaray
Albums
 2008: Bookends (Produced by Fatgums and Gammaray) by Novelists
 2008: The Appetizer by The CounterParts
 2009: Beatrock Presents: Fatgums X Bambu ...A Peaceful Riot... by Fatgums x Bambu
 2009: The CounterParts LP by The CounterParts
 2010: Remittances by Power Struggle
 2010: Gumstrumentals Volume I by Fatgums
Featured Production
 2005
 The Committee - "Struggles" (The Committee EP)
 2008
 Bambu - "Make Change" (...Exact Change...)
 Bambu - "Seven Months" (...Exact Change...)
 Bambu - "Exact Change" (...Exact Change...)
 Bambu - "Iron Bam" (...Exact Change...)
 ReVision - "Forward Progress ft. DJ Krissfader" (Forward Progress Mixtape)
 ReVision - "Daily Grind ft. C-Los" (Forward Progress Mixtape)
 2009
 Geologic (of Blue Scholars), Kiwi & Bambu (of Native Guns) - "Divide & Conquer" (A Song For Ourselves Mixtape by DJ Phatrick)
 2010
 Rocky Rivera - "The Rundown" (Rocky Rivera)
 Bambu - "The Queen Is Dead" (...Paper Cuts...)
 2011
 Bambu - "Jonah's Lament" (...exact change... Reloaded)
 Dregs One - "Think About It" (The Wake Up Call Mixtape)
 Prometheus Brown and Bambu - "Lookin Up" (Prometheus Brown and Bambu Walk Into A Bar)
 Otayo Dubb - "Jerry McGuire" (Cold Piece of Work)
 Otayo Dubb - "A Lil' More (feat. Bambu)" (Cold Piece of Work)
 2012
 Bwan - "Infinite" (Living Room)
 Bwan - "Grindstone" (Living Room)
 Bwan - "Lyricists (feat. Akil)" (Living Room)
 2013
 Patience - "City Love" (Broken Hourglass)
 Bambu - "Sun In A Million" (Sun Of A Gun)
 Rocky Rivera - "Air Mail" (Gangster of Love)
 2014
 Power Struggle - "A Round For My Friends" (In Your Hands)
 Power Struggle - "Live That Life" (In Your Hands)
 Power Struggle - "Falling From The Sky" (In Your Hands)
 2015
 Rocky Rivera - "Godsteppin" (Nom de Guerre)
 Rocky Rivera - "Turn You" (Nom de Guerre)

References

External links
 Official Fatgums Blog
 FATGUMS X BAMBU EPK Electronic Press Kit
 Beatrock
 Beatrock Music
Album Reviews
 Taylor, Patrick "Power Struggle :: Remittances", RapReviews.com
 Kiwi "POWER STRUGGLE – “REMITTANCES” (A REVIEW)", The Deconstruction of Kiwi Illafonte
 Taylor, Patrick "The CounterParts LP", RapReviews.com
 Taylor, Patrick "Fatgums X Bambu: A Peaceful Riot Going On", RapReviews.com
 The Mixshow Commander "Fatgums/Bambu: A Peaceful Riot", The Slap Report
 Ryan, Gabe, & Robins, Freesia. "OHHSSH!! DJ's Release First Mixtape!", The Guardsman

Hip hop record producers
American hip hop record producers
American hip hop DJs
Underground hip hop producers
1980 births
Living people
DJs from San Francisco
University of California, Los Angeles alumni
Hip hop musicians from San Francisco
Record producers from California